de Mestre may refer to:

In people:
 Etienne L. de Mestre (1832-1916), Australian racehorse trainer
 John de Mestre Hutchison, CMG, CVO (1862-1932), British officer of the Royal Navy 
 Maribel Parra de Mestre (born 1965),  Venezuelan naval officer and oil company executive
 Prosper de Mestre (1789-1844), prominent Sydney businessman

See also 
John de Mestre Hutchison, Royal Navy admiral
 Roy De Maistre, Australian artist